Inès Taittinger (born 7 April 1990) is a French racing driver.

Biography
Inès Taittinger is an endurance racing driver. She runs for the CD Sport team on the French championship: VdeV in the category proto endurance challenge, since 2009.

Initiated in Motorsports by her father  (Hugues Taittinger) and her godfather and mentor Philippe Alliot, Taittinger started racing at 20 years old.

In 2013, Taittinger took part in the 25 Heures de Spa-Francorchamps VW Fun Cup with the Kronos Racing Team. In this race, she ran alongside other French drivers such as Margot Laffite, Arnaud Tsamère, Xavier Daffe, Pierre-Yves Rosoux and Fabrice Brouwers.

Since 2013, Taittinger is also the official ambassador of the city of Touquet-Paris-plage in France.

In 2016, Taittinger will race for Morgan in the LM-P2 category at the 24 Hours of Le Mans.

In 2019, Taittinger attempted to qualify for the W Series, but failed to progress beyond the evaluation day.

Civic engagement
Taittinger was born with a heart defect. When she was three days old, she went through an open-heart surgery. This experience led her to involve herself with the French charity association Mécénat Chirurgie Cardiaque. This association raises fund to heal children suffering from heart defect all around the world.

Racing records
In 2013, Taittinger came first in the Albi race from the Endurance Tourism Trophy (TTE). She also finished third in the Magny-Cours race during this same trophy.

For the 2013 season of the V de V championship endurance Series, Taittinger, with her teammate Kevin Bole-Besançon, came third in the 12 hours of Motorland Aragon race in Spain. They also finished fifth in the six hours of Magny-Cours race in France.

Racing record

24 Hours of Le Mans results

References

External links
Inestaittinger.fr

1990 births
Living people
24 Hours of Le Mans drivers
French racing drivers
French female racing drivers